

186001–186100 

|-id=007
| 186007 Guilleminet ||  || Pierre-François de Guilleminet (1691–1755), a French astronomer and mathematician with the Montpellier Royal Society of Sciences and designer of the Babote Observatory. || 
|}

186101–186200 

|-id=142
| 186142 Gillespie ||  || Bruce Gillespie (born 1950), is an American astronomer with the Sloan Digital Sky Survey (SDSS). He was the Apache Point Observatory Operations Site Manager and the SDSS-III and -IV Program Manager || 
|}

186201–186300 

|-bgcolor=#f2f2f2
| colspan=4 align=center | 
|}

186301–186400 

|-bgcolor=#f2f2f2
| colspan=4 align=center | 
|}

186401–186500 

|-id=411
| 186411 Margaretsimon ||  || Margaret Simon (born 1967), a strategic communications manager at the Johns Hopkins University Applied Physics Laboratory, who served as the External Events Coordinator for the New Horizons mission to Pluto. || 
|}

186501–186600 

|-bgcolor=#f2f2f2
| colspan=4 align=center | 
|}

186601–186700 

|-bgcolor=#f2f2f2
| colspan=4 align=center | 
|}

186701–186800 

|-bgcolor=#f2f2f2
| colspan=4 align=center | 
|}

186801–186900 

|-id=832
| 186832 Mosser ||  || Mosser Roger (1936–1990), a French self-taught optician || 
|-id=835
| 186835 Normanspinrad ||  || Norman Spinrad (born 1940), American science-fiction writer || 
|}

186901–187000 

|-bgcolor=#f2f2f2
| colspan=4 align=center | 
|}

References 

186001-187000